is a Japanese construction equipment company which is into the manufacturing, sales and service of construction machinery, transportation machinery, and other machines and devices. It is a subsidiary of the Hitachi Group.

History 
Hitachi Construction Machinery Co., Ltd. was established in 1970, and was involved in the production of Japan's first mechanical excavator. The company has now become a major construction equipment manufacturer in the world, and it is listed on the Nikkei 225.

In January 2022, the parent company, Hitachi, sold 26 percent of its remaining 51% stake to Itochu Corp.

Products

Current products
Excavators models ZX130-5G, ZX70-5G / ZX70LC-5G, ZX160LC-5G, ZX180LCN-5G, ZX200-5G / ZX200LC-5G, ZX210LCN-5А, ZX210H-5G / ZX210LCH-5G, ZX210K-5G / ZX210LCK-5G, ZX240-5G / ZX240LC-5G, ZX250H-5G / ZX250LCH-5G, ZX250K-5G / ZX250LCK-5G, ZX300-5A / ZX300LC-5A, ZX330-5G, ZX350H-5G / ZX350LCH-5G, ZX350K-5G / ZX350LCK-5G, ZX400LCH-5G
Loaders
Recycle machines
Compaction equipment
Dump trucks
others

Past products
Bulldozers
Crawler cranes (models SCX550E, SCX700E и SCX1000A-3) - transferred to Hitachi Sumitomo Heavy Industries Construction Crane Co., Ltd.
others

Others
Hitachi Construction Machinery builds anti-personnel landmine removal equipment based on excavators. It is developed by Yamanashi Hitachi Construction Machinery Co., Ltd. under the leadership of Kiyoshi Amemiya, the president.

Affiliated companies
Japan
Hitachi Construction Machinery Japan Co., Ltd.
Hitachi Construction Machinery Camino Co., Ltd.
Hitachi Construction Machinery REC Co., Ltd.
Hitachi Construction Machinery Tiera Co., Ltd.
Hitachi Sumitomo Heavy Industries Construction Crane Co., Ltd.
Yamanashi Hitachi Construction Machinery Co., Ltd.
Okinawa Hitachi Construction Machinery Co., Ltd.
HCL Co., Ltd.
UniCarriers Corporation
Asia
Hitachi Construction Machinery Asia and Pacific Pte. Ltd.
P.T. Hitachi Construction Machinery Indonesia (Indonesia)
Hitachi Construction Machinery (Thailand) Co., Ltd (Thailand)
Tata Hitachi Construction Machinery Co. Pvt. Ltd. (India)
Yungtay-Hitachi Construction Machinery Co., Ltd. (Taiwan)
Hitachi Construction Machinery (China) Co.
Hitachi Construction Machinery Co., Ltd.(Malaysia) 
Africa
Hitachi Construction Machinery Africa Ltd (Africa)
Hitachi Construction Machinery South Africa Pty. Ltd. (South Africa)
Europe
Hitachi Construction Machinery (Europe) N.V. (Netherlands)
North America
Deere-Hitachi Construction Machinery Corporation (US)
Hitachi Construction Truck Manufacturing Ltd. (Canada)
Wenco International Mining Systems Ltd. (Canada)
Oceania
Hitachi Construction Machinery (Australia) Pty. Ltd.
Hitachi Construction Machinery (Oceania) Pty. Ltd.

References

External links
Hitachi Construction Machinery Global website
Hitachi Construction Machinery Australian website
Hitachi Construction Machinery Eurasia website

Hitachi
Companies listed on the Tokyo Stock Exchange
Manufacturing companies established in 1951
Construction equipment manufacturers of Japan
Defense companies of Japan
Japanese companies established in 1951